Pseudatemelia fuscifrontella is a moth of the family Oecophoridae. It was described by Constant in 1885. It is found on Corsica.

The wingspan is about 19 mm.

References

Amphisbatinae
Moths of Europe
Moths described in 1885